The Fincastle Resolutions was a statement reportedly adopted on January 20, 1775, by fifteen elected representatives of Fincastle County, Virginia. Part of the political movement that became the American Revolution, the resolutions were addressed to Virginia's delegation at the First Continental Congress, and expressed support for Congress' resistance to the Intolerable Acts, issued in 1774 by the British Parliament.

Background
Other counties in Virginia had passed resolutions similar to the Fincastle Resolutions in 1774, such as the Fairfax Resolves, but the Fincastle Resolutions were the first adopted statement by the colonists which promised resistance to the death to the British crown to preserve political liberties.  Throughout 1774, the Fincastle signatories had been fighting in Dunmore's War against the Shawnee to the west, and were not able to formally express their sentiments about the constitutional dispute until January 1775.  The Fincastle representatives reportedly adopted the resolutions at Lead Mines (modern Austinville, Virginia), the county seat, located in what is now Wythe County, Virginia.

Content of the Resolutions

The published text of the resolutions began by proclaiming love for and loyalty to King George III, and that "we are willing to risk our lives in the service of his Majesty, for the support of the Protestant Religion, and the rights and liberties of his subjects..." But the resolutions go on to express dismay that the passage of the Intolerable Acts has threatened the happy relations between "the parent state and the Colonies", and that these violations of constitutional rights are not acceptable.

Context
Historian Jim Glanville writes:
"The actions of the Fincastle committee should not (as they almost always have been) viewed in isolation. Rather, they should be examined in relation to the actions of the committees of Augusta, Botetourt, and Pittsylvania . . . Each of the statements adopted by these four counties pledged (in varying language) that the men who adopted them would give their lives in the cause of American liberty."

Signatories
The 15 reported signatories of the Fincastle Resolutions were: 

Arthur Campbell 
David Campbell
William Campbell 
William Christian 
Walter Crockett 
Charles Cummings 
William Edmondson 
William Ingles 
Thomas Madison 
James McGavock 
John Montgomery 
William Preston 
Evan Shelby 
Daniel Smith
Stephen Trigg 

The clerk of the meeting was David Campbell.

See also
 Augusta Resolves

References

 
 Fincastle Resolves; includes a transliteration of article of February 10, 1775 from "The Smithfield Review;" Williamsburgh, VA; via V Tech Library on-line; article: The Smithfield Review" – Volume XIV – Appendix A; (pub: 2010); accessed October 2020.

External links
 Preston, Thomas L.; Historical Sketches and Reminiscences of an Octogenarian;  Richmond, Va.:  B. F. Johnson Publishing Co.; (1900); pp. 24-28; contains possible text of the Resolutions.

1775 in the Thirteen Colonies
Virginia in the American Revolution
Documents of the American Revolution
1775 in Virginia
1775 documents